Call of the Jungle is a 1944 adventure mystery film directed by  Phil Rosen. It stars Ann Corio, James Bush and John Davidson.

Cast
Ann Corio as Tana
James Bush as Jim
John Davidson as Harley
Claudia Dell as Gracie
Eddy Chandler as Boggs (credited as Edward Chandler)
Muni Seroff as Louie
I. Stanford Jolley as Carlton
Alex Havier as Malu (credited as J. Alex Havier)
Philip Van Zandt as Dozan (credited as Phil Van Zandt)
Harry Burns as Kahuna
Jay Silverheels as Native (uncredited)

See also
List of American films of 1944

References

External links 
 

1944 films
1944 adventure films
1944 mystery films
American adventure films
American mystery films
Films scored by Albert Glasser
Monogram Pictures films
American black-and-white films
Films directed by Phil Rosen
1940s American films